Oliver Jacob Mellor (born 30 January 1981 in Windsor, Berkshire) is a British actor and former personal trainer, perhaps best known for playing the role of Matt Carter in ITV soap opera Coronation Street from 20 August 2010, departing on 5 April 2013 after a three-year stint on the show.

Personal life

Mellor grew up in Windsor, Berkshire with his father, a hotelier, his mother, a flight attendant and his older sister. He graduated  from the Webber Douglas Academy of Dramatic Art in summer 2005. Before he became an actor, Mellor was a personal trainer and a former county rugby player where he suffered many injuries. He enjoys sports including fencing, fishing, rugby, skiing, snowboarding, and running.

Career

Between 2003-2005 Mellor appeared many times on stage, starring in productions such as Twelve Angry Men, Cyrano de Bergerac, The Man of Mode and Pericles, Prince of Tyre.

On television Mellor appeared in the Doctor Who episode "Army of Ghosts" in 2006 as Torchwood Institute employee Matt in the penultimate episode featuring Billie Piper. In that same year he appeared as Det. Monroe in late night Hollyoaks spin-off Hollyoaks: In The City and as Dr. Fitzgerald in ITV's The Royal.

In 2007 he appeared in BBC soap EastEnders in the role of Geoff. In the same year he guest-starred in three episodes of ITV soap Emmerdale as Ricky Walsh as well as playing Matt in an episode of the second series of E4 drama Skins. The episode entitled Tony was broadcast on 17 March and focused on the character played by Nicholas Hoult.

In 2008 he guest-starred in BBC daytime soap Doctors as Jack Smith in the episode Love Will Find a Way. In February 2011 he guest-starred in an episode of Midsomer Murders playing the character Julian Woodley in the episode "Fit For Murder". The episode was broadcast on 2 February.

He starred as Dr. Matt Carter in ITV soap opera Coronation Street. He made his first appearance in the role on 20 August 2010. He signed for an initial four episodes during the exit storyline of Natasha Blakeman. He then made further appearances which included firing Gail Platt from her job as medical centre receptionist for breaching the rules of patient confidentiality. He appeared during the soap's 50th anniversary week providing medical care and first aid to those injured by the tram accident. He appeared in the one-hour live episode which aired Thursday 9 December. He appeared again on 27 December 2010 briefly giving medical advice to John Stape. He appeared occasionally on screen throughout January and February 2011 during storylines involving John Stape and Peter Barlow. It was announced that he quit the show in June 2013, however Matt didn't have an on-screen exit and hasn't been seen on the show since April 2013.
In 2011 he took part in a charity challenge from Get On Africa where he learnt to ride motorbikes to deliver lifesaving medical support in the mountainous and remote villages of Lesotho with other celebrities including his Coronation Street co-star Shobna Gulati.

Credits

Television

Stage

Audio

References

External links

Twitter account
Agency Profile
Facebook Group
New hunky doctor for Coronation Street 

1981 births
Living people
English male stage actors
English male television actors
Webber Douglas Academy of Dramatic Art